The Happy Camp Complex Fire was a massive wildfire that broke out on August 12, 2014, at 1:00 AM PDT, as a result of a lightning strikes in the Klamath National Forest in Northern California. The fire, which would eventually consume  of land, was the largest fire of the 2014 California wildfire season and as of 2018, ranks 20th on the list of largest fires in state history.

The wildfire
The wildfire also ignited smaller spot fires to the northwest of the main fire, all the way up to a couple miles of the California-Oregon border. By September 21, the fire complex had reached 80% containment. During the next 2 weeks, the Happy Camp Complex gradually increased in size, reaching  on September 27; however, the containment of the fire complex also reached 97% on the same day. On October 31, the Happy Camp Complex was finally extinguished by precipitation from a winter storm that was moving through California.

The wildfire was estimated to have caused a total of $86.7 million (2014 USD) in damage.

See also
Klamath Theater Complex Fire

References

External links
 

2014 California wildfires
Wildfires in Siskiyou County, California
Klamath National Forest
August 2014 events in the United States
September 2014 events in the United States
October 2014 events in the United States